Nova Scotia created the Nova Scotia Accessibility Act in 2017. It is similar to the Accessibility for Manitobans Act, and further supports the rights of People with Disabilities (PwD) under the Canadian Charter of Rights and Freedoms. 

The goals of the Act is to prevent and remove barriers for the delivery and receipt of goods and services, information and communication, public transportation and transportation infrastructure, employment, the built environment, education, and a prescribed activity or undertaking. The Act establishes a Accessibility Directorate and an Accessibility Advisory Board to support this work.  

Nova Scotia's Accessibility Directorate has responsibility for administering the Accessibility Act and advancing disability issues within the government. This Act commits the government of Nova Scotia to develop accessibility standards for goods and services,  information and communication, transportation, employment, the built environment and education.

See also 
 Nova Scotia Human Rights Commission
 Ontarians with Disabilities Act for the corresponding Ontario legislation.
 The Accessibility for Manitobans Act for the corresponding Manitoba legislation.
 Accessible British Columbia Act
 Accessible Canada Act
 Disability Discrimination Act for the corresponding UK legislation.
 Americans with Disabilities Act of 1990 for the corresponding American legislation.

References

External links 
Accessibility Directorate
SiteImprove: Nova Scotia Accessibility Act
2017 in Canadian law
Anti-discrimination legislation
Nova Scotia law
Disability in Canada
Disability legislation
Disability law in Canada
2017 in Nova Scotia